Dialectica geometra is a moth of the family Gracillariidae. It is known from Hong Kong, Japan (the Ryukyu Islands), India (West Bengal, Tamil Nadu, Bihar, Delhi and Uttar Pradesh) and Réunion. It has recently been recorded from China.

The wingspan is 6.5–8.2 mm.

The larvae feed on Cordia amplifolia, Cordia myxa, Ehretia laevis and Ehretia species, including Ehretia microphylla. They mine the leaves of their host plant.

References

Moths described in 1916
Dialectica (moth)
Moths of Asia
Moths of Japan
Moths of Africa